Northern Areas Council is a local government area in the Yorke and Mid North region of South Australia. The council seat and main council offices are at Jamestown, while the council also maintains district offices at Gladstone and Spalding.

History
Most of the region was first settled in the early 1840s, only a few years after the settlement of Adelaide. Several explorers had passed through the area on their way to more remote places, including Edward John Eyre and John Horrocks.

The Northern Areas Council came into effect on 3 May 1997, when the District Council of Rocky River, the District Council of Spalding and the District Council of Jamestown merged. Rocky River and Jamestown had themselves previously been subject to a number of amalgamations, and had a large number of predecessor municipalities; in contrast, the Spalding council had a much different history, as prior to the merger, it had been an independent municipality predating the landmark District Councils Act 1887.

Localities

The district encompasses a number of towns and localities, including Andrews, Beetaloo Valley, Belalie East, Belalie North, Broughton River Valley, Bundaleer Gardens, Bundaleer North, Caltowie, Caltowie North, Caltowie West, Euromina, Georgetown, Gladstone, Gulnare, Hacklins Corner, Hornsdale, Jamestown, Laura, Mannanarie, Mayfield, Narridy, Spalding, Washpool, West Bundaleer and Yacka, and part of Appila, Canowie Belt, Huddleston, Stone Hut, Tarcowie and Yatina.

Council

See also
List of parks and gardens in rural South Australia

References

External links
Northern Areas Council

Local government areas of South Australia
Mid North (South Australia)